The Harbor - Silver League is a California high school sports league that is part of the CIF Southern Section. The league does not support football.

Members
 Ánimo Leadership Charter High School
 Environmental Charter High School	
 Hope Centre Academy
 Zinsmeyer Academy

References

CIF Southern Section leagues